Divina Grace Yu (née Cabardo) is a Filipino politician who currently serves as the representative of the first district of Zamboanga del Sur in the 17th and 18th Congress of the Philippines. She previously served as city vice mayor of Pagadian. Yu is among the 70 representatives who voted to reject the franchise renewal of ABS-CBN.

Political career
In 2013, Yu made her run for vice mayor of Pagadian alongside Romeo "Tata" Pulmones under the Nationalist People's Coalition, defeating Romeo Vera Cruz of the Liberal Party.

House of Representatives
In the 18th Congress, she is currently one of the vice chairpersons of the House Committee on Accounts; one of the vice Chairperson of the House Committee on Inter-Parliamentary Relations and Diplomacy; and sits in as member of the House Committees on Ecology, Appropriations, and Disaster Resilience. On July 10, 2020, along with 70 other members of Congress, Yu voted to reject the franchise renewal of ABS-CBN. Since December 7, 2020, Yu serves as one of the House deputy speakers under the leadership of House Speaker Lord Allan Velasco.

Electoral performance

≥u

Personal life 
She is married to Victor Yu; they have three children.

References 

Year of birth missing (living people)
Living people
Members of the House of Representatives of the Philippines from Zamboanga del Sur